was a town located in Kamitsuga District, Tochigi Prefecture, Japan.

As of 2003, the town had an estimated population of 6,975 and a density of 217.97 persons per km². The total area was 32.00 km².

On October 1, 2011, Nishikata was merged into the expanded city of Tochigi. Kamitsuga District was dissolved as a result of this merger.

Every year the students from the junior high visit the Sunshine Coast, Australia.

References
Japanese Wikipedia article on Nishikata Town

External links
 Tochigi official website 

Dissolved municipalities of Tochigi Prefecture